St. Andrew's College is a Roman Catholic college in the Bandra suburb of Mumbai, India. The college was inaugurated on 9 July 1983 by Simon Pimenta, Archbishop of Bombay (1978–1996), with 194 students. It is an under-graduate college offering junior and degree courses with a student strength of over 4,000.

Notable alumni
Genelia D'Souza
Sarah-Jane Dias
Maria Goretti.
Carol Gracias
Tara Sutaria
Shruti Haasan
Erica Fernandes
Jude Menezes

See also 
St. Andrew's High School

References

Universities and colleges in Mumbai
Catholic universities and colleges in India
Educational institutions established in 1983
1983 establishments in Maharashtra
Bandra
Colleges in India
Affiliates of the University of Mumbai